Lose a Million was an early 1990s British game show which was produced by Action Time for Carlton Television and was hosted by Chris Tarrant.  The show featured voiceovers by Honor Blackman.

In a twist to the traditional gameshow format, the contestants each started with a group of pretend prizes worth a total of £1 million and attempted to lose as many of them as possible by answering questions incorrectly. The contestant with the lowest total prize value after three rounds was declared the winner and received the opportunity to play for £5,000.

The set of the show resembled an Art Deco cruise ship.

Format
Three contestants competed through three rounds of play. At the beginning of the game, they were each "given" five extravagant prizes whose retail value totaled £1 million; however, one of them actually had little or no value. The value of a prize was not revealed until it was first chosen to be removed from a contestant's inventory.

In the first round, each contestant had to give incorrect answers to as many questions as possible within a time limit, and was encouraged to be humorous in their responses. The contestant who gave the most incorrect answers could discard one prize; if two or more contestants tied in this respect, each could discard a prize.

For the second round, each contestant was asked a series of 10 questions, the first of which always asked them to state their name. They had to refrain from answering this one, then respond to each of the others with the correct answer for the question before it. Questions were written for comic effect with the mismatched answers. The contestant who gave the most correct answers could discard one prize, with ties handled as in the first round.

During the third round, the host made two passes through the field, asking one question to each contestant per pass. Questions in this round had two answer choices and had to be answered incorrectly. A contestant who missed a question could pass one prize to an opponent, while a correct answer allowed both opponents to pass a prize to the contestant who gave it. The contestant with the lowest total at the end of this round became the day's champion.

In the final round, the champion was asked a question with six answer choices, five of which were incorrect. The champion had to eliminate one of these answers at a time by placing a £200,000 bundle of cash on a carriage at one end of a track corresponding to that answer. The host then pressed a button to set the carriage in motion; if the answer was indeed incorrect, the cash disappeared in a burst of pyrotechnics at the other end of the track. If the champion successfully eliminated all five incorrect answers in this manner, he/she won £5,000. Choosing the correct answer at any time ended the round and awarded the champion £500 per incorrect answer eliminated to that point.

Legacy
The show is briefly featured in the film Shallow Grave, with Ewan McGregor watching it on television and calling out segments of the host's opening monologue along with the studio audience.

Ironically, five years after this show ended, Tarrant went on to host Who Wants to Be a Millionaire?; the objective of which is entirely the opposite of Lose a Million.

International versions
In Singapore, a similar version called Here's A Million, was aired on MediaWorks TV Works in 2001.

This version debuted in Indonesia called Tantangan 1 Milyar (The Billion Rupiah Challenge), was aired on SCTV in 1997. It was hosted by Jody Sumantri.

An adaptation was broadcast in Germany called Verlieren Sie Millionen (Lose Millions) aired on second public-broadcaster ZDF in 1995. While still an active player, football manager Jurgen Klopp took part in the show.

In Catalonia and the Land of Valencia was called Ruïna Total, and Gezurra nagusi n the Basque Country.

References

External links

1993 British television series debuts
1993 British television series endings
1990s British game shows